Verona Verbakel (born 15 September 1992 in Gent) is a Belgian actress.

Acting career 

Verona Verbakel has been working with theater company Ontroerend Goed since 2009. She was cast in theater productions Once and for all we're gonna tell you who we are so shut up and listen (in the English, French, German and Italian version) and Teenage Riot.

For Sirens (2014-2017), a feminist performance from the same theater company, she received The stage award for acting excellence for Best Ensemble at the Edinburgh Festival Fringe 2014.

In 2013, she performed The depth of the valley by Rataplan and director Dimitri Leue.

In 2014 she graduated Magna cum laude at the Royal Conservatory Antwerp (BE) for Drama Acting, one of her teachers being Ivo van Hove from ITA.

From 2015 until 2018 she performed her theatre solo The Audition. In 2017 she performed La democrazia in America by Italian director Romeo Castellucci. From 2016 until 2019 she played the lead in Liv by The Mannschaft. In 2018 she performed Das Reingold/Half of the Ring by Dutch theatre company De Warme Winkel. In 2019 her dance solo Pablo premiered at Vooruit Ghent with the support of Dansvitrine. From 2020 until 2022 she performed Work Harder by Dutch theatre company Wunderbaum and Belgian actress and directress Lies Pauwels, in the Dutch and German version.

Some of her movie and television parts include: Margaret Kelley in A Quiet Passion by Terence Davies as the maid of Emily Dickinson by Cynthia Nixon; a Wehrmacht Secretary in The Exception, Hilde in the French movie Rattrapage, Polly in Out of the blue, into the black; as a German punkerin in Dunkelstadt and various parts in Flemish television series such as Chanelle in Slippery Ice, Vicky in Undercover 3 and Liv in Under Fire.

Theater 

 2023 - Het Ego (BE)
 2022 - Well-Behaved Women Seldom Make History (NL, UK)
 2020-2022 - Work Harder - Lies Pauwels & Wunderbaum (NL, DE)
 2019 - Pablo - Dansvitrine (BE)
 2017 - La democrazia in America - Romeo Castellucci & Societas (BE, NL)
 2016-2019 - Liv - De Mannschaft (BE, NL)
 2015-2018 - De Auditie - Het Kartel (BE)
 2013-2018 - Das Reingold & De Halve Ring - Toneelgroep Amsterdam / De warme Winkel (BE, NL, SK)
 2013-2017 - Sirens - Ontroerend Goed (BE, NL, UK, CH)
 2013 - De diepte van het dal - Dimitri Leue & Rataplan (BE)
 2009-2013 - Teenage Riot - Ontroerend Goed (BE, NL, D, DK, IT, UK, A, SE, AUS)
 2009-2010 - Once and for all we're gonna tell you who we are so shut up and listen - Ontroerend Goed (BE, NL, USA, AUS, CAN, IRL)
 2009-2010 - Remember Me - Kopergietery (BE, NL)

Television 

 Documentary Now! (2022) - as Beatrice
 Two Summers (2022) - as Nora
 Undercover (season 3) (2021) - as Vicky
 Under Fire (2021) - as Liv
 Slippery Ice (2021) - as Chanelle
 VY-inc (2020) - as Rachel
 Darktown (2020) - as Punkerin
 De Kotmadam (2019) - as student
 The Flemish Bandits (2018) - as Magdaleine
 De zonen van Van As (2017) - as Marilyn
 Please, Love Me (2017) - as Saar
 Witse (2010) - as Maya

Film 

 The Pod Generation (2023) - as Radical Feminist
 Cold Light (2020) - as Lore
 Love Paranoid (short) (2019) - as Laura
 La vida era eso (2019) - as Marie Anne
 The spy (2019) - as make-up girl 
 Domino (2019) - as secretary Wold
 Out of the blue into the black (short) (2017) - as Polly
 Rattrapage (2017) - as Hilde
 De linde vertelt (2016) - as Katrijn
 The Exception (2016) - as Wehrmacht secretary
 A Quiet Passion (2016) as Mararet Kelley

References

External links 
 Verona Verbakel on IMDB
 VTi - Personen - Verona Verbakel

1992 births
Living people
Belgian stage actresses
21st-century Belgian actresses